Taking New York   is a structured-reality television series broadcast by E4 in the United Kingdom. Taking New York chronicles the lives of a group of twenty-something British friends striving to make their American Dream come true.  Featured locations include Brooklyn, Manhattan and Staten Island.

History
The show was first announced following a Channel 4 press release in August 2014.  A first series of eight episodes was commissioned by Channel 4’s Head of Formats Dom Bird. The first series began on Monday 9 February 2015.

Main cast

Ratings

These viewing figures are taken from BARB.

Series

Series 1 (2015)

The reality-series was announced in August 2014. E4 reads "Taking New York is a reality series that follows the lives and loves of a group of British twenty-somethings as they battle to build their American Dream life in The Big Apple". Filming for the series took place between June and September 2014. The first series full-length trailer was revealed on 29 December 2014, six weeks before the official series premiere. The first series of Taking New York began on Monday 9 February 2015 for eight episodes.

Reception

Reviews for the first series were positive, with Radio Times saying, "Taking New York has the glossiness and drama of Made in Chelsea with the likability and comedy of The Only Way Is Essex - and it's silly, fun and completely addictive".

International broadcast
The series premiered in Australia on 21 June 2015 on LifeStyle You.

References

See also
 The Only Way Is Essex
 Made in Chelsea
 Geordie Shore
 Desperate Scousewives
 The Real Housewives of Cheshire
 Ladies of London
 The Valleys
 Desi Rascals

2015 British television series debuts
E4 reality television shows
English-language television shows
Television shows set in New York City
2015 British television series endings
Television series by ITV Studios